Euzophera albipunctella is a species of snout moth in the genus Euzophera. It was described by Ragonot in 1887, and is known from China.

References

Moths described in 1887
Phycitini
Moths of Asia